Eucalyptus obesa, commonly known as the Ninety Mile Tank mallee, is a species of mallee that is endemic to Western Australia. It has smooth, greyish to pale brown bark, usually lance-shaped adult leaves, flower buds in groups of between eleven and fifteen, creamy white flowers and shortened spherical to hemispherical fruit.

Description
It has smooth greyish to brownish bark with loose ribbons of shed bark near the base, and a canopy that reaches almost to the ground. Flowering occurs from December to January and the flowers are creamy white.

Taxonomy and naming
Eucalyptus obesa was first formally described in 1993 by Ian Brooker and Stephen Hopper in the journal Nuytsia, from specimens collected by Brooker north-west of Tarin Rock. The specific epithet (obesa) is from the Latin obesus meaning "fat", referring to the buds, compared to the spindle-shaped buds of E. decipiens.

Distribution and habitat
The Ninety Mile Tank mallee is found from north-west of Lake Grace to the 90-mile Tank and Peak Charles where it grows in sandy soils.

Conservation status
This eucalypt is classified as "not threatened" by the Government of Western Australia Department of Parks and Wildlife.

See also
List of Eucalyptus species

References

Eucalypts of Western Australia
obesa
Myrtales of Australia
Plants described in 1993
Taxa named by Ian Brooker
Taxa named by Stephen Hopper